Streptomyces glauciniger is a mesophilic bacterium species from the genus of Streptomyces which has been isolated from soil in south China.

See also 
 List of Streptomyces species

References

Further reading

External links
Type strain of Streptomyces glauciniger at BacDive -  the Bacterial Diversity Metadatabase

glauciniger
Bacteria described in 2004